The City of Bradford Metropolitan District Council elections were held on Thursday, 2 May 1996, with one third of the council up for election. Labour retained control of the council.

Election result

|- style="background-color:#F9F9F9"
! style="background-color: " |
| Militant Labour
| align="right" | 0
| align="right" | 0
| align="right" | 0
| align="right" | 
| align="right" | 0.0
| align="right" | 0.3
| align="right" | 362
| align="right" | +0.1%
|-

This result had the following consequences for the total number of seats on the council after the elections:

Ward results

|- style="background-color:#F9F9F9"
! style="background-color: " |
| Militant Labour
| M. Dominguez 
| align="right" | 151
| align="right" | 5.3
| align="right" | -3.8
|-

|- style="background-color:#F9F9F9"
! style="background-color: " |
| Militant Labour
| L. Wilkinson 
| align="right" | 38
| align="right" | 1.1
| align="right" | +1.1
|-

|- style="background-color:#F9F9F9"
! style="background-color: " |
| Militant Labour
| C. Thompson 
| align="right" | 43
| align="right" | 0.8
| align="right" | +0.8
|-

|- style="background-color:#F9F9F9"
! style="background-color: " |
| Militant Labour
| S. Jackson 
| align="right" | 130
| align="right" | 2.8
| align="right" | +2.8
|-

By-elections between 1996 and 1998

References

1996 English local elections
1996
1990s in West Yorkshire